The list of Ohio Townships provides an alphabetic list of the 1362 current and historic townships in Ohio. While some have been totally absorbed into cities or villages, becoming paper townships, the list does not give historic names for any that were renamed.

The 2018-2019 Ohio Municipal, Township and School Board Roster (maintained by the Ohio Secretary of State) lists 1,308 townships, with a 2010 population totaling 5,623,956. When paper townships are excluded, but name variants counted separately (e.g. "Brush Creek" versus "Brushcreek", "Vermilion" versus "Vermillion"), there are 618 different names used by townships statewide, including 451 names used only once.  On the opposite end of the spectrum, forty-three townships are named "Washington", and eight other names are used for twenty or more townships each.

See also
 List of counties in Ohio
 List of cities in Ohio
 List of villages in Ohio

References 

Townships
Ohio